Markus Gottschlich is an Austrian jazz pianist and composer.

Life and career
Gottschlich was born and grew up in Vienna. He began playing the piano at the age of five. When he was seventeen, he left Vienna for St. Petersburg, Florida. He studied at Admiral Farragut Academy, Concordia College in New York, and Western Connecticut State University. He played in China before moving to Miami around 2007. Gottschlich toured Austria for a month in 2013, including playing at the Vienna Jazz Festival. In 2013 he was curator of the inaugural Miami Beach Jazz Festival. In 2014 he became a Steinway Artist. 

In 2015 he represented the U.S. as a guest speaker and panelist at the International Festival Forum in London, England. In 2016 he served as a juror for the showcase festival Jazzahead! in Bremen, Germany. Also in 2016 he founded Jazz Academy Miami and toured Taiwan and South Korea to perform and conduct workshops.

In 2018 he was named Executive Director of the New Mexico Jazz Workshop in Albuquerque. He later became Director of Music Operations at Jazz House Kids in New Jersey.

Discography
 When the Day Is Done (2008)
 Of Places Between (2013)
 Found Sounds (2020)

References

External links 
 Official website
 Downbeat magazine
 Der Standard in German
 VoyageMia
 ABQ Journal

Living people
Year of birth missing (living people)
21st-century pianists
Austrian jazz pianists
Concordia College (New York) alumni
Western Connecticut State University alumni